Nipun Malhotra may refer to:

 Nipun Malhotra (cricketer) (born 1993), Indian cricketer
 Nipun Malhotra (social entrepreneur) (born 1987), Indian social entrepreneur and disability rights activist